Tănase, is a frequent Romanian surname, Romanian form of Athanasius (from the ancient greek name: Athanasios, Αθανάσιος). Originally it was a given name with the form Atanase and Atanasie (Archaic Romanian) and then took the form of Tanase. Nowadays it occurs as both first name and surname. It may refer to:

 Alexandru Tănase (b. 1971), Moldovan politician
 Anca Tănase (born 1968), Romanian rower
 Carmen Tănase (b. 1961), Romanian actress
 Constantin Tănase (1880–1945), a key figure in the revue style of theater in Romania
 Cristian Tănase (b. 1987), Romanian footballer
 Florin Tănase (born 1994), Romanian footballer 
 Maria Tănase (1913–1963), Romanian singer of traditional and popular music
 Stelian Tănase (b. 1952), leading figure of Romanian civil society

See also
 Tănase (river), in Bistrița-Năsăud County, Romania

Surnames
Romanian-language surnames